Wyndham Gittens (7 February 1885 – 18 June 1967) was a West Indian screenwriter. He wrote for more than 60 films between 1917 and 1966. He was born in Barbados, West Indies and died in Dunedin, Florida.

Selected filmography

 Tim Tyler's Luck (1937)
 The Lost Jungle (1934)
 The Mystery Squadron (1933)
 The Three Musketeers (1933)
 The Devil Horse (1932)
 The Hurricane Express (1932)
 The Last of the Mohicans (1932)
 The Shadow of the Eagle (1932)
 The Lightning Warrior (1931)
 The Galloping Ghost (1931)
 King of the Wild (1931)
 The Phantom of the West (1931)
 The Lone Defender (1930)
 The King of the Kongo (1929)
 The Fatal Warning (1929)
 The Red Sword (1929)
 Hey Rube! (1928)
 The Vanishing West (1928)
 Crashing Through (1928)
 Vultures of the Sea (1928)
 Stranded (1927)
 Pretty Clothes (1927)
 Western Pluck (1926)
 The Lodge in the Wilderness (1926)
 Out of the West (1926)
 The Power of the Weak (1926)
 The Everlasting Whisper (1925)
 Greater Than a Crown (1925)
The Measure of a Man (1924)
 The Sunset Trail (1924)
 Alimony (1924)
 Desert Driven (1923)
 Itching Palms (1923)
 Can a Woman Love Twice? (1923)

External links

1885 births
1967 deaths
Barbadian screenwriters
20th-century Barbadian writers
20th-century screenwriters
Barbadian emigrants to the United States